Warner Premiere was an American direct-to-video label of Warner Bros. Home Entertainment, itself a subsidiary of Warner Bros.

History

Early years (2006–2008)
In 2006, Warner Bros. Home Entertainment announced that they would enter the market of releasing original direct-to-video films, a market that has proven lucrative for studios over the past few years. They announced much of their output would be follow-ups to films that had done well at the box office theatrically, but wouldn't be expected to do well if a sequel were to be made. The first release under the Warner Premiere banner was the prequel film The Dukes of Hazzard: The Beginning. Their second title release was a sequel to the 1999 horror film House on Haunted Hill titled Return to House on Haunted Hill. In addition to the live-action output, the label was used for several direct-to-video animated films from Warner's corporate siblings such as DC Comics and Warner Bros. Animation.

The label released Get Smart's Bruce and Lloyd: Out of Control – a spin-off of the 2008 film Get Smart – on DVD and Blu-ray on July 1, 2008. The film follows the adventures of the two tech experts from the first film played by Masi Oka and Nate Torrence, respectively. It was also written by the two writers of the previous film.

Later years (2008–2013)
On July 29, 2008, Warner Premiere released Lost Boys: The Tribe, a sequel to the 1987 horror film The Lost Boys, on DVD and Blu-ray. Corey Feldman reprised his role of vampire hunter Edgar Frog; Corey Haim appeared in a cameo. In September 2008, Warner Premiere released the direct-to-DVD sequel of Hilary Duff's hit film A Cinderella Story titled Another Cinderella Story, starring Selena Gomez. After the 2009 Sundance Film Festival, Warner Bros. announced through Warner Premiere that the film Spring Breakdown would be released straight-to-DVD on April 9 according to Home Media Magazine.

A sub-label of Warner Premiere was Raw Feed, which released horror/thriller films and Warner Premiere Digital, which released original internet projects.

Due to growing economic uncertainty and being a huge slump on the DVD market, Warner Bros. announced in 2012 that it had shut down Warner Premiere after six years of operation. Despite this, titles continued to be published under the Warner Premiere label until the following year, the last being Scooby-Doo! Stage Fright.

Filmography

References

External links 
 Warner Premiere

Film production companies of the United States
2006 establishments in the United States
2013 disestablishments in the United States
Warner Bros. divisions